Christian County is located in the southwestern part of the U.S. state of Missouri. As of the 2020 census, its population was 88,842. Its county seat is Ozark. The county was organized in 1859 and is named after William Christian, a Kentucky soldier of the American Revolutionary War.

Christian County is part of the Springfield, MO Metropolitan Statistical Area. Between 2000 and 2010, it was the fastest-growing county in the state and one of the fastest growing ones in the nation as the county became more suburban due to the booming growth in Springfield.

Geography
The county is drained by James River and branches of the White River. The surface is undulating or hilly.

Adjacent counties
Greene County (north)
Webster County (northeast)
Douglas County (east)
Taney County (south)
Stone County (southwest)
Lawrence County (west)

Major highways
 U.S. Route 60
 U.S. Route 65
 U.S. Route 160
 Route 13
 Route 14
 Route 125

National protected area
Mark Twain National Forest (part)

Demographics

As of the census of 2000, there were 54,285 people, 20,425 households, and 15,645 families residing in the county. The population density was 96 people per square mile (37/km2). There were 21,827 housing units at an average density of 39 per square mile (15/km2). The racial makeup of the county was 97.31% White, 0.27% Black or African American, 0.56% Native American, 0.29% Asian, 0.03% Pacific Islander, 0.42% from other races, and 1.13% from two or more races. Approximately 1.32% of the population were Hispanic or Latino of any race. 23.7% were of American, 21.1% German, 12.3% English and 11.3% Irish ancestry.

There were 20,425 households, out of which 38.60% had children under the age of 18 living with them, 64.00% were married couples living together, 9.30% had a female householder with no husband present, and 23.40% were non-families. 19.10% of all households were made up of individuals, and 7.00% had someone living alone who was 65 years of age or older. The average household size was 2.63 and the average family size was 3.00.

In the county, the population was spread out, with 27.80% under the age of 18, 8.10% from 18 to 24, 31.70% from 25 to 44, 21.80% from 45 to 64, and 10.60% who were 65 years of age or older. The median age was 34 years. For every 100 females, there were 94.70 males. For every 100 females age 18 and over, there were 91.50 males.

The median income for a household in the county was $50,200, and the median income for a family was $58,806. Males had a median income of $31,929 versus $21,852 for females. The per capita income for the county was $23,873. About 7.10% of families and 9.10% of the population were below the poverty line, including 13.20% of those under age 18 and 7.80% of those age 65 or over.

2020 Census

Politics

Local
The Republican Party controls politics at the local level in Christian County. The Republicans hold all of the elected positions in the county.

On May 20, 2015, Sheriff Joey Kyle plead guilty to embezzling county funds and participating in an illegal fraud scheme. As a part of a plea agreement, he immediately resigned as sheriff, was sentenced to one year plus one day in federal prison, and must repay more than $50,000 in restitution to Christian County.

State

Christian County is divided into three legislative districts in the Missouri House of Representatives, all of which are represented by Republicans.

District 138 — Don Phillips (R-Kimberling City). Consists of the communities of Billings and part of Republic.

District 139 — Rep. Jered Taylor (R-Nixa). Consists of the communities of Clever, Highlandville, Nixa, and Spokane.

District 140 — Rep. Lynn Morris (R-Ozark). Consists of the communities of Freemont Hills, Ozark, Saddlebrook, and Sparta.

All of Christian County is a part of Missouri's 20th  District in the Missouri Senate and is currently represented by Eric Burlison (R-Battlefield).

Federal

All of Christian County is included in Missouri's 7th Congressional District and is currently represented by Billy Long (R-Springfield) in the U.S. House of Representatives.

Political culture

Like most counties situated in Southwest Missouri, Christian County is a Republican stronghold in presidential elections. George W. Bush carried Christian County in 2000 and 2004 by more than two-to-one margins, and like many other rural and exurban counties throughout Missouri, Christian County strongly favored John McCain over Barack Obama in 2008. The only Democratic Presidential candidate to win Christian County since the Civil War has been Franklin Delano Roosevelt in 1932. In the 2016 presidential election, Donald Trump was the favored candidate receiving 30,941 votes.

Like most areas throughout the Bible Belt in Southwest Missouri, voters in Christian County traditionally adhere to socially and culturally conservative principles which tend to strongly influence their Republican leanings. In 2004, Missourians voted on a constitutional amendment to define marriage as the union between a man and a woman—it overwhelmingly passed Christian County with 80.46 percent of the vote. The initiative passed the state with 71 percent of support from voters as Missouri became the first state to ban same-sex marriage. In 2006, Missourians voted on a constitutional amendment to fund and legalize embryonic stem cell research in the state—it failed in Christian County with 58.98 percent voting against the measure. The initiative narrowly passed the state with 51 percent of support from voters as Missouri became one of the first states in the nation to approve embryonic stem cell research. Despite Christian County’s longstanding tradition of supporting socially conservative platforms, voters in the county have a penchant for advancing populist causes like increasing the minimum wage. In 2006, Missourians voted on a proposition (Proposition B) to increase the minimum wage in the state to $6.50 an hour—it passed Christian County with 73.01 percent of the vote. The proposition strongly passed every single county in Missouri with 78.99 percent voting in favor as the minimum wage was increased to $6.50 an hour in the state. During the same election, voters in five other states also strongly approved increases in the minimum wage.

Missouri presidential preference primary (2008)

Voters in Christian County from both political parties supported candidates who finished in second place in the state at large and nationally. Former Governor Mike Huckabee (R-Arkansas) received more votes, a total of 5,852, than any candidate from either party in Christian County during the 2008 Missouri Presidential Preference Primary.

Education

Public schools
Billings R-IV School District - Billings
Billings Elementary School (PK-06)
Billings High School (07-12)
Chadwick R-I School District - Chadwick
Chadwick Elementary School (PK-06)
Chadwick High School (07-12)
Clever R-V School District - Clever
Clever EleMiddle School (PK-08)
Clever High School (09-12)
Logan-Rogersville R-VIII School District - Rogersville
Logan-Rogersville Primary School - (PK-01)
Logan-Rogersville Elementary School - (02-03)
Logan-Rogersville Upper Elementary School - (04-06)
Logan-Rogersville Middle School - (07-08)
Logan-Rogersville High School - (09-12)
Nixa R-II School District - Nixa
Nixa Early Childhood Center (PK)
High Pointe Elementary School (K-04)
Mathews Elementary School (K-04)
Century Elementary School (K-04)
Espy Elementary School (K-04)
John Thomas School of Discovery (K-06)
Nicholas A. Inman Intermediate School (05-06)
Summit Intermediate School (05-06)
Nixa Jr. High School (07-08)
Nixa Public High School (09-12)
Ozark R-VI School District - Ozark
North Elementary School (K-04)
East Elementary School (K-04)
West Elementary School (K-04)
South Elementary School (K-04)
Upper Elementary School (05-06)
Ozark Jr. High School (07-08)
Ozark High School (09-12)
Sparta R-III School District - Sparta
Sparta Elementary School (PK-05)
Sparta Middle School (06-08)
Sparta High School (09-12)
Spokane R-VII School District - Spokane
Highlandville Elementary School (PK-05) - Highlandville
Spokane Middle School (06-08)
Spokane High School (09-12)

Private schools
Faith Christian School - Spokane - (PK-12) - Baptist

Colleges and universities
Ozarks Technical Community College - Richwood Valley Campus - Public

Public libraries

Christian County Library System 
Christian County currently has three public library branches that serve the community. The Christian County Library (CCL) operates these branches. The library offers residents books, A/V materials, programming, printing, and WiFi access. There is a branch in Ozark, Nixa, and Clever. In August 2019, the library announced the continuation of their expansion to the public. Construction is set to begin on at least one new library branch by spring 2020.

Tax Approval 
On Tuesday, August 8, 2017, voters in Christian County approved to instate a 20-cent property tax levy. Sixty-eight percent of the voters approved the tax. Before this tax, the library was only able to operate one branch for the whole county. To accommodate new housing and population growth in the county, CCL announced their intentions to construct and/or open new branches around the county. The tax approval also allowed for a renovation of the original Ozark Branch. CCL expects eighty-five percent of the population in Christian County to be within a five mile radius of the library after all intended branches are opened. 

Christian County Library
Billings City Library

Public safety
Billings Fire Protection District
Billings Police Department
Chadwick Fire Protection District - Chadwick
Christian County Ambulance District
Christian County Sheriff's Department
Clever Fire Protection District
Clever Police Department
Highlandville Fire Protection District
Highlandville Police Department
Nixa Fire Protection District
Nixa Police Department
Ozark Fire Protection District
Ozark Police Department
Sparta Fire Protection District
Sparta Police Department

Communities

Cities

Billings
Clever
Fremont Hills
Highlandville
Nixa (largest city)
Ozark (county seat)
Republic (mostly in Greene County)
Sparta
Springfield (mostly in Greene County)

Village
Saddlebrooke (small portion in Taney County)

Census-designated place
Spokane

Other unincorporated communities

Boaz
Bruner
Chadwick
Chestnutridge
Elkhead
Garrison
Keltner
Linden
Oldfield

Townships

Billings Township
Chadwick Township
East Benton Township
Finley Township
Garrison Township
Lead Hill Township
Lincoln Township
Linden Township
McCracken Township
North Galloway Township
North Linn Township
Oldfield Township
Polk Township
Porter Township
Seneca Township
South Galloway Township
South Linn Township
Sparta Township
West Benton Township

In popular culture
The 2010 film Winter's Bone was filmed entirely in Taney County and Christian County. Many locals were cast in significant roles in the film.

See also
National Register of Historic Places listings in Christian County, Missouri

References

External links
 Official Website
 Digitized 1930 Plat Book of Christian County  from University of Missouri Division of Special Collections, Archives, and Rare Books

 
Missouri counties
Springfield metropolitan area, Missouri
1859 establishments in Missouri
Populated places established in 1859